Marek Krawczyk (born 23 March 1976 in Gdańsk, Pomorskie) is a retired breaststroke swimmer from Poland, who competed for his native country at two consecutive Summer Olympics, starting in 1996 (Atlanta, Georgia).

A member of AZS-AWF Gdańsk he is best known for winning the bronze medal at the 1997 European Swimming Championships in the men's 4×100 m medley relay, alongside Mariusz Siembida, Marcin Kaczmarek and Bartosz Kizierowski.

External links

1976 births
Living people
Polish male breaststroke swimmers
Olympic swimmers of Poland
Swimmers at the 1996 Summer Olympics
Swimmers at the 2000 Summer Olympics
Sportspeople from Gdańsk
European Aquatics Championships medalists in swimming